Art Taylor is an American short story writer, book critic and an English professor.

Early life and education
Taylor was born and raised in Richlands, North Carolina. He graduated from Episcopal High School, a private school in Alexandria, Virginia. He went onto Yale University where in 1990 he graduated with a Bachelor of Arts, and he received a Master of Arts in 2003 from North Carolina State University and a Master of Fine Arts in 2006 from George Mason University.

Career
Taylor's short fiction won an Edgar Award in 2019; an Anthony Award in 2015; Agatha Awards in 2014, 2015, and 2017; Macavity Awards in 2014, 2017, 2019, and 2020; and four Derringer Awards: for Best Novelette in 2011 and 2021 and for Best Long Story in 2012 and 2013. He is the author of On the Road with Del & Louise: A Novel in Stories (2015), which won the Agatha Award for Best First Novel in 2016. He edited Murder Under the Oaks: Bouchercon Anthology 2015, which won the Anthony Award for Best Anthology or Collection in 2016. In addition to writing fiction, he also reviews mysteries and thrillers for The Washington Post and contributes to Mystery Scene magazine.

He is an assistant professor of English at George Mason University.

Bibliography

On the Road With Del & Louise: A Novel in Stories (2015). 
The Boy Detective & The Summer of '74 and Other Tales of Suspense (2020). 
The Adventure of the Castle Thief and Other Expeditions and Indiscretions (2023).

Personal life
Taylor is married to editor and novelist Tara Laskowski, and they have one son, Dash.

References

External links

Year of birth missing (living people)
Living people
American short story writers
American literary critics
Agatha Award winners
Macavity Award winners
George Mason University faculty
George Mason University alumni
American male short story writers
American male non-fiction writers
Anthony Award winners